Kepnes is a surname. Notable people with the surname include:

 Caroline Kepnes (born 1976), American writer, screenwriter, author, and entertainment reporter
 Matthew Kepnes (born 1981), American travel expert, author, and blogger

See also
 Kepner